Lifeburst is a novel by Jack Williamson published in 1984.

Plot summary
Lifeburst is a novel in which the space-dwelling elite of the 22nd century command huge ships that open fire on peaceful contact ships.

Reception
Dave Langford reviewed Lifeburst for White Dwarf #89, and stated that "This book will take you right back, probably to before you were born."

Reviews
Review by Algis Budrys (1985) in The Magazine of Fantasy & Science Fiction, May 1985
Review by Tom Easton (1985) in Analog Science Fiction/Science Fact, September 1985
Review by Robert Coulson (1986) in Amazing Stories, May 1986

References

1984 American novels
1984 science fiction novels
Fiction set in the 22nd century
Novels by Jack Williamson